The Men's Freestyle 70 kg is a competition featured at the 2020 European Wrestling Championships, and was held in Rome, Italy on February 14 and February 15.

Medalists

Results 
 Legend
 F — Won by fall

Final

Top half

Bottom half

Repechage

References

External links
Bracket

Men's Freestyle 70 kg